Hirvensalo-Kakskerta is a ward (Finnish , Swedish ) of Turku, Finland, also known as Ward 2. The ward consists of the islands of Hirvensalo, Satava and Kakskerta, as well as some smaller islands, in the Archipelago Sea off the city's coastline.

By population, this is the smallest ward in Turku, with a population of only 7,944. However, it is also the fastest growing one, as its population increases 1.45% annually. It is also the city's youngest ward, as 24.99% of its population are under 15 years old, while only 8.06% are over 65. The ward's linguistic makeup is 91.40% Finnish, 6.45% Swedish, and 2.15% other.

Districts
The ward consists of 16 districts, most of which are located on Hirvensalo.

See also
Districts of Turku
Wards of Turku

Wards of Turku